The following is a list of the faculties and departments of the University of Alberta.

Main Campus

Agriculture
 Faculty of Agricultural, Life and Environmental Sciences  (AFHE)
 Department of Agricultural, Food and Nutritional Science  (AFNS)
 Devonian Botanic Garden 
 Department of Human Ecology 
 Department of Renewable Resources 
 Department of Rural Economy

Arts
 Faculty of Arts 
 Department of Anthropology 
 Department of Art and Design 
 Arts Resource Centre 
 CSL Community Service-Learning 
 Department of Drama 
 Department of East Asian Studies 
 Department of Economics 
 Department of English and Film Studies 
 Department of History and Classics 
 Office of Interdisciplinary Studies 
 Comparative Literature Program 
 Humanities Computing Program  (HUCO)
 Middle Eastern and African Studies Program  (MEAS)
 Peace and Post-Conflict Studies Program 
 Religious Studies Program 
 Science, Technology and Society Program  (STS)
 Department of Linguistics 
 Department of Modern Languages and Cultural Studies  (MLCS)
 Department of Music 
 Department of Philosophy 
 Department of Political Science 
 Department of Psychology 
 Department of Sociology 
 Women's Studies Program

Business 
 School of Business 
 Department of Accounting and Management Information Systems  (AMIS)
 Department of Finance and Management Science  (FMS)
 Department of Marketing, Business Economics, and Law  (MABEL)
 Department of Strategic Management and Organization  (SMORG)

Education
 Faculty of Education 
 Department of Educational Policy Studies 
 Department of Educational Psychology 
 Department of Elementary Education 
 Department of Secondary Education 
 Division of Technology in Education  (DTE)
 School of Library and Information Studies  (SLIS)

Engineering
 Faculty of Engineering 
 Department of Chemical and Materials Engineering  (CME)
 Department of Civil and Environmental Engineering 
 School of Mining and Petroleum Engineering 
 Department of Electrical and Computer Engineering  (ECE)
 Department of Mechanical Engineering 
 Engineering Co-op Program

Extension
 Faculty of Extension 
 Applied Sciences Programs 
 Business Programs 
 Adult and Continuing Education Programs 
 Communications and Technology Programs  (MACT)
 English Language Programs  (ELP)
 Government Studies Programs 
 Liberal Studies Programs 
 Medical Acupuncture Program

Graduate Studies
 Faculty of Graduate Studies and Research  (FGSR)
 Professional Development Programs 
 University Teaching Program  (UTP)
 University of Alberta Outreach

Law
 Faculty of Law

Medicine
 Faculty of Medicine and Dentistry 
 Division of Anatomy 
 Department of Anaesthesiology and Pain Medicine 
 Department of Biochemistry 
 Department of Biomedical Engineering 
 Department of Cell Biology 
 Centre for Neuroscience 
 Division of Critical Care Medicine 
 Department of Dentistry 
 Department of Family Medicine 
 Health Ethics Centre 
 Department of Laboratory Medicine & Pathology 
 Department of Medical Genetics 
 Department of Medical Microbiology and Immunology 
 Department of Medicine 
 Department of Obstetrics & Gynaecology 
 Department of Oncology 
 Department of Ophthalmology 
 Department of Paediatrics 
 Department of Pharmacology 
 Division of Physical Medicine and Rehabilitation 
 Department of Physiology 
 Department of Psychiatry 
 Department of Radiology and Diagnostic Imaging 
 Department of Surgery

Native Studies
 Faculty of Native Studies

Nursing
 Faculty of Nursing

Pharmacy
 Faculty of Pharmacy and Pharmaceutical Sciences

Recreation
 Faculty of Physical Education and Recreation

Public Health
 School of Public Health 
 Alberta Centre for Injury Control & Research 
 Centre for Health Promotion Studies 
 Department of Public Health Sciences

Rehabilitation
 Faculty of Rehabilitation Medicine 
 Department of Occupational Therapy 
 Department of Physical Therapy 
 Rehabilitation Research Centre 
 Department of Speech Pathology and Audiology 
 Centre for Studies in Clinical Education  (CSCE)
 Institute for Stuttering Treatment and Research  (ISTAR)

Science

 Faculty of Science 
 Department of Biological Sciences 
 Department of Chemistry 
 Department of Computing Science 
 Department of Earth & Atmospheric Sciences 
 Department of Mathematical and Statistical Sciences 
 Department of Physics 
 Department of Psychology

Campus Saint-Jean

 Faculté Saint-Jean  (FSJ)

Augustana Campus

 Augustana Faculty 
 Department of Fine Arts 
 Department of Humanities 
 Department of Physical Education 
 Department of Science 
 Department of Social Sciences

Affiliated colleges

 St. Joseph's College 
 St. Stephen's College

External links
 University of Alberta
 Faculties and Departments

University of Alberta